USS Dogfish (SS-350), a , was the only vessel of the United States Navy to be named for the dogfish.

Her keel was laid down on 22 June 1944 by the Electric Boat Company in Groton, Connecticut. She was launched on 27 October 1945 sponsored by Mrs. A. M.  Morgan, and commissioned on 29 April 1946.

Dogfish sailed out of New London, Connecticut, on local duties and cruised to the Caribbean Sea and Bermuda to conduct training. She was overhauled and extensively modernized at the Philadelphia Naval Shipyard from August 1947 to April 1948, and then served in experimental projects as well as normal operations at New London. From 31 October to 19 November 1948 she took part in large-scale fleet exercises ranging from the waters off Florida to Davis Strait between Labrador and Greenland.

She cruised to Scotland, England, and France between 4 February and 3 April 1949 and joined in a convoy exercise off Cape Hatteras in February and March 1952, and operated along the east coast and in the Caribbean Sea during the next three years.

Dogfish sailed from New London on 1 March 1955 for her first tour with the Sixth Fleet in the Mediterranean Sea, returning to her home port 6 June. The submarine called at Halifax, Nova Scotia, from 4 June to 14 June 1956 during NATO Operation New Broom. On 8 November, she stood by and fought the fires on the trawler Agda during local operations out of New  London. She cruised to Faslane Bay in Scotland between 31 January and 12 April 1958 to evaluate new equipment, and from 23 May to 8 August 1959 served in the Mediterranean Sea. In October and November, she took part in NATO antisubmarine warfare exercises. After extensive overhaul, the vessel resumed local operations from New London through 1960.

Transfer to Brazil
Dogfish was stricken from the Naval Vessel Register and sold to Brazil on 28 July 1972. She served the Brazilian Navy as Guanabara (S-10) until being deleted in 1983.

References

External links
John Bryan Rushing Jr - U.S.S. Dogfish crewman reminisces (45 minute video)

 

Balao-class submarines
Ships built in Groton, Connecticut
1945 ships
World War II submarines of the United States
Cold War submarines of the United States
Balao-class submarines of the Brazilian Navy